Aldara may refer to:
Former name of Alvanq, a community or municipality in Armenia
Àldara, Sardinian name of Ardara, Sardinia, a comune or municipality
Imiquimod or Aldara, a prescription medication that acts as an immune response modifier

See also
Aldara Park, Gauteng, a suburb of Johannesburg, South Africa